Wick Sheriff Court is a judicial structure in Bridge Street, Wick, Caithness, Scotland. The structure, which remains in use as a courthouse, is a Category B listed building.

History
In the 17th and 18th centuries, the county town of Caithness and the venue for sheriff court hearings was Thurso. However, in the early 19th century, Wick developed significantly and, following a decree of the Court of Session, hearings were transferred from Thurso to Wick in 1828. Hearings were subsequently held in a courtroom in the newly-completed Wick Town Hall.

In the 1860s, the Commissioners of Supply decided that Wick needed a dedicated courthouse: the site they selected was just to the north of the town hall. The new building was designed by David Rhind in the Renaissance Revival style, built in ashlar stone and was officially opened on 16 May 1866.

The design involved a symmetrical main frontage of three bays facing onto Bridge Street. The central bay featured a round headed doorway with a keystone and an architrave flanked by pairs of Doric order pilasters supporting an entablature and a cornice. The outer bays on the ground floor were fenestrated by round headed sash windows with keystones and architraves while all three bays on the first floor were fenestrated by bi-partite round headed windows with balustrades, colonnettes and rosettes in the spandrels. At attic level, there was a central tower with a window and a mansard roof flanked by aediculae and, beyond that, by piers surmounted by ball finials. Internally, the principal room was the main courtroom on the first floor.

Following the implementation of the Local Government (Scotland) Act 1889, which established county councils in every county, the new county leaders needed to identify a meeting place for Caithness County Council and duly arranged to take possession of the sheriff court and town hall complex in Bridge Street. However, in the 1930s, the county council sought dedicated county offices and acquired a building in the High Street known as Stafford Place for that purpose.

After the abolition of Caithness County Council in 1975, the building continued to serve a judicial function, being used for hearings of the sheriff's court and, on one day a month, for hearings of the justice of the peace court.

Notes

See also
 List of listed buildings in Wick, Highland

References

External links

Government buildings completed in 1866
County halls in Scotland
Category B listed buildings in Highland (council area)
Wick, Caithness
Court buildings in Scotland